SELU or selu may refer to:
 Sailu, a town in Maharashtra, India, also known as Selu
 Southeastern Louisiana University
 Cherokee mythology for maize
 Selu: Seeking the Corn-Mother's Wisdom, a book by Marilou Awiakta